The ball is an apparatus used in rhythmic gymnastics. It is made of either rubber or synthetic material (pliable plastic) provided it possesses the same elasticity as rubber. The ball can be of any colour. The ball should rest in the gymnast's hand and not rest against the wrist or be able to be grasped.

Fundamental elements of a ball routine include throwing, bouncing or rolling. The gymnast must use both hands and work on the whole floor area whilst showing continuous flowing movement.

The ball is sometimes placed on their back while the gymnast does a skill such as a walk-over.

Rhythmic gymnastics apparatus
Balls